KCMA-LP (92.1 FM) was a nonprofit, listener-supported radio station licensed to serve Payson, Arizona. The station was owned by Payson Classical Music Appreciation Inc. It aired a Classic Hits format that the station described as "musical favorites from the '50s, '60s and '70s". In addition to its usual music programming, KCMA-LP aired news programming from the USA Radio Network.

The station was assigned the KCMA-LP call letters by the Federal Communications Commission on June 24, 2002.

Payson Classic Music Appreciation surrendered KCMA-LP's license to the FCC on June 29, 2021, who cancelled it the same day.

See also
 List of community radio stations in the United States

References

External links
 
 KCMA-LP service area per the FCC database

CMA-LP
Classic hits radio stations in the United States
CMA-LP
Radio stations established in 2003
Mass media in Gila County, Arizona
Defunct community radio stations in the United States
2003 establishments in Arizona
Defunct radio stations in the United States
Radio stations disestablished in 2021
2021 disestablishments in Arizona
CMA-LP